Gymnopilus subfulgens is a species of mushroom in the family Hymenogastraceae.

See also

List of Gymnopilus species

External links
Gymnopilus subfulgens at Index Fungorum

subfulgens